Metamatic is the debut solo album by John Foxx, released in 1980. It was his first solo project following his split with Ultravox the previous year. A departure from the mix of synthesizers and conventional rock instrumentation on that band's work, Metamatic was purely electronic in sound. The name 'Metamatic' comes from a painting machine by kinetic artist Jean Tinguely, first exhibited at the Paris Biennial in 1959. The album peaked at #18 on the UK Albums Chart.

Production and style 
Metamatic was recorded at Pathway Studios, a small eight-track studio in Islington, and was engineered by Gareth Jones. Foxx's electronic equipment included an ARP Odyssey, an Elka 'String Machine' and a Roland CR-78 drum machine. Several of the synth parts were played by John Wesley-Barker.

The album was heavily influenced by the writings of J. G. Ballard. Six of the tracks referenced automobiles or motorways, most obviously "Underpass" and "No-One Driving". (Foxx re-worked the former track as "Overpass" on the live Subterranean Omnidelic Exotour in 1998). The song "He's a Liquid" was influenced by a still from a Japanese horror film depicting a suit draped across a chair in such a way as to suggest that the wearer had liquified; Foxx's lyrics also alluded to the 'fluidity' of human relationships. The final track, "Touch and Go", included psychedelic aspects.

Although Foxx had performed "He's a Liquid" and "Touch and Go" live with Ultravox before leaving the band in 1979, the band was not credited for them on Metamatic. When Ultravox adapted the tune from "Touch and Go" for the song "Mr. X" on Vienna (1980), their first album following Foxx's departure, Foxx was not credited.

Release and aftermath 
Metamatic spent seven weeks in the UK charts, peaking at #18. The album was generally well received by critics and is still cited as his most influential solo release.

Singles and reissues
"Underpass" was released as an edited single a week before the album (length: 3:18), making #31 in the UK charts and appearing on a number of electropop compilations of the time. Its B-side was a non-album instrumental, "Film One". In March 1980 a remix of "No-One Driving" was released as a double single with three other non-album tracks: "Glimmer", "Mr No" and "This City", reaching #32.

In June 1980, Foxx released a single with new songs on both sides, "Burning Car" b/w "20th Century", making #35. He issued one more single-only release in October 1980, the transitional "Miles Away" b/w "A Long Time", which provided a foretaste of the more fully produced sound of his next album, The Garden (1981). All these non-album tracks have appeared on various John Foxx compilations and reissues of Metamatic; the 1993 CD version of the album also included "Young Love", a previously unreleased track recorded in 1979. A 'definitive' two-CD reissue of the album was released in September 2007 which was intended to bring together all the Metamatic-era material, plus previously unavailable tracks, onto one bonus CD. Another re-mastered edition was released as a 3CD Deluxe Edition in 2018. This included fifteen instrumentals on disc three, as the new reissue project grew to forty-nine tracks across three CDs.

Foxx's record label and his official website are also named Metamatic.

Metal Beat interview
An in-depth interview with Foxx by Steve Malins about the making of Metamatic is the subject of a double-CD album "Metal Beat" released in 2007. The interview includes extracts from demos of No-One Driving, Touch and Go and Like A Miracle and an extended version of Plaza, together with some early experiments by Foxx with drum machines and analogue synthesisers and tracks retrieved from two 1980 tapes marked "music for film" and "instrumentals". A 30-second piece entitled Jane is also included.

Critical reception
Trouser Press wrote: "Metamatic is Foxx’s first venture alone into the world of synthesizers (...) In emulation of his own work and Conny Plank’s production on Ultravox’s Systems of Romance, Foxx (aided by another synthesist and a bassist) finds the perfect counterpart for his themes of alienation and dislocation in sterile, minimalist electronic sounds. His vocals are oddly distant, like echoes, but the record has an honesty and directness that are quite affecting."

In a Record Collector review of the 2007 reissue Ian Shirley concluded: "To be frank, however, Metamatic has not worn well. Although the analogue synth textures work well on the singles and tracks such as Plaza, Metal Beat and Touch & Go, the rhythms of the drum machines and overall sound of A New Kind Of Man and Tidal Wave are very dated. Considering how adventurous and warm the Human League’s Reproduction and Travelogue from the same period are, Metamatic is the sound of musical austerity."

The 2018 reissue received a positive review by Kieron Tyler: "Metamatic feels as much about melody as the then-current musical tools. “He’s a Liquid” and “Touch and Go” had been played live by Ultravox so, clearly, Foxx was honing some of the album’s songs before they were recorded; there was pre-planning. There’s also a timelessness, born from to the combination of Foxx’s chops as a songwriter and the use of pre-digital synths which had to be configured manually. The sounds and arrangements Foxx came up with were his own. The only track which has dated is “Metal Beat” due to its borrowings from elements of Kraftwerk's “Showroom Dummies” and “The Robots”. Overall, Metamatic is poppy, romantic, and refracts the aura of concrete-filled urban environments and the power they exert."

Track listing 
All tracks written by John Foxx.

 "Plaza" – 3:52
 "He's a Liquid" – 2:59
 "Underpass" – 3:53
 "Metal Beat" – 2:59
 "No-One Driving" – 3:45
 "A New Kind of Man" – 3:38
 "Blurred Girl" – 4:16
 "030" – 3:15
 "Tidal Wave" – 4:14
 "Touch and Go" – 5:33

1993 reissue bonus tracks 
 "Young Love" – 3:10
 "Film One" – 3:58
 "20th Century" – 3:06
 "Miles Away" – 3:17
 "A Long Time" – 3:49
 "Swimmer 1" – 4:06

2001 reissue bonus tracks 
 "Film One" – 3:58
 "Glimmer" – 3:33
 "Mr. No" – 3:14
 "This City" – 3:03
 "20th Century" – 3:06
 "Burning Car" – 3:12
 "Miles Away" – 3:17

2007 reissue bonus disc 
 "Film One"
 "This City"
 "To Be With You"
 "Cinemascope"
 "Burning Car"
 "Glimmer"
 "Mr No"
 "Young Love"
 "20th Century"
 "My Face"
 "Like a Miracle" (alternative version)
 "A New Kind of Man" (alternative version)
 "He's a Liquid" (alternative version)

 "To Be With You" and "Cinemascope" were created by sampling and arranging audio clips from material previously recorded with analogue equipment.

2014 Record Store Day white vinyl reissue 
Track listing as per the original 1980 vinyl issue but in new gatefold sleeve with artwork featuring rare images and reconstructions.
Track Listings
Disc: 1
1	Plaza
2	He's a Liquid
3	Underpass
4	Metal Beat
5	No-one Driving
6	A New Kind of Man
7	Blurred Girl
8	030
9	Tidal Wave
10	Touch and Go
Disc: 2
1	Film One
2	This City
3	To Be With You
4	Cinemascope
5	Burning Car
6	Glimmer
7	Mr. No
8	Young Love
9	20th Century
10	My Face
11	Underpass (Radio Edit)
12	Non-one Driving (Single Version)
13	Like a Miracle
14	A New Kind of Man
15	He's a Liquid
16	Plaza (Extended Version)
17	Underpass (Extended Version)
18	Blurred Girl (Lounge Fade Version)
Disc: 3
1	A Frozen Moment
2	He's a Liquid (Instrumental Dub)
3	Mr. No
4	The Uranium Committee
5	A Man Alone
6	Over Tokyo
7	Terminal Zone
8	Urban Code
9	A Version of You
10	Glimmer
11	Fragmentary City
12	Metamorphosis
13	Approaching the Monument
14	Critical Mass
15	Alamogordo Logic
16	Touch and Go (Early Version)
17	Miss Machinery
18	No-one Driving (Early Version)
19	Burning Car (Early Version)
20	Like a Miracle (Early Version)
21	No-one Driving

Charts

Personnel 
 John Foxx – vocals, rhythm machines (mainly Roland CR-78), synthesizers and keyboards
 John Wesley Barker – additional synthesizers and keyboards
 Jake Durant – bass guitar
 Gareth Jones – engineer

Keyboards used on the album include the Minimoog, ARP Odyssey, clavinet, Elka Rhapsody 610, piano, Farfisa string synth, and Hammond organ.

References

External links
Metamatic website
John Foxx (1992). Assembly CD liner notes

John Foxx albums
1980 debut albums
Virgin Records albums